Your Love is Raymond Lam's second album, released on 10 September 2008. It contains ten tracks. The second version was released two weeks later on 24 September with three extra music videos. Lam achieved platinum level on 10 October 2008 in Hong Kong by surpassing 90,000 copies in sales.

Track listing

 愛不疚 Love Without Regret (Moonlight Resonance Ending Theme)
 愛人與海 Lover and Sea
 Tonight
 明天以後 (林峯/泳兒) After Tomorrow (Cantonese version duet with Vincy Chan)
 憑良心說再見 Saying Goodbye With Conscience
 影子的愛情故事 Shadow's Love Story
 浮生若水 Living As Gentle As Water (The Master of Tai Chi Ending Theme)
 All About Your Love
 夏雪 Summer Snow
 明天以後 (國語)(林峯/泳兒) After Tomorrow (Mandarin version duet with Vincy Chan)

External links
Album Information
Raymond's Album received Platinum

2008 albums
Raymond Lam albums